Marie Farge (born 1953) is a French mathematician and physicist who works as a director of research at CNRS, the French National Centre for Scientific Research. She is known for her research on wavelets and turbulence in fluid mechanics.

Education and career
Farge earned a master's degree from Stanford University in 1977, and a third cycle doctorate in physics from Paris Diderot University in 1980. After postdoctoral studies on a Fulbright Fellowship at Harvard University, she continued her studies at Pierre and Marie Curie University, where she completed a state doctorate in 1987.

She has been a researcher at CNRS since 1981. She has also held short-term positions at many other universities, including being Sofia Kovaleskaia Chair of Mathematics in 1994–95 at Kaiserslautern University.

Recognition
Farge was the 1993 winner of the Poncelet Prize of the French Academy of Sciences. She became a member of the Academia Europaea in 2005, and a fellow of the American Physical Society in 2011.

References

External links
Home page

1953 births
Living people
French mathematicians
French physicists
French women mathematicians
French women physicists
Stanford University alumni
Members of Academia Europaea
Fellows of the American Physical Society
Research directors of the French National Centre for Scientific Research